Thomas Vannoye (born 11 July 1998) is a French professional footballer who plays as a defender for Belgian club Francs Borains on loan from the  club Dunkerque.

Career
Vannoye made his professional debut with Dunkerque in a 5–0 loss to Clermont on 16 January 2021.

On 31 January 2023, Vannoye was loaned to Francs Borains in Belgium.

References

External links
 
 USL Dunkerque Profile

1998 births
Sportspeople from Dunkirk
Footballers from Hauts-de-France
Living people
French footballers
Association football defenders
USL Dunkerque players
Francs Borains players
Ligue 2 players
Championnat National players
Championnat National 3 players
French expatriate footballers
Expatriate footballers in Belgium
French expatriate sportspeople in Belgium